"White Lightning" is a song written by the rockabilly artist J. P. Richardson, best known by his stage name, the Big Bopper. The song was recorded by American country music artist George Jones and released as a single in February 1959. On April 13, 1959, Jones' version was the first number-one single of his career. The song has since been covered by numerous artists.  Richardson never got to see the success of the record, as he had been killed in an airplane accident 6 days before its release.

Recording and composition
In his 1997 autobiography, I Lived To Tell It All, Jones recalls arriving for the recording session under the influence of a great deal of alcohol and the track took approximately 80 takes. To compound matters, bassist Buddy Killen was reported to have developed blisters from replaying his part dozens of times. As a result, Killen not only threatened to quit the session, but also threatened to physically harm Jones for the painful consequences of Jones' drinking.  Ultimately, producer Pappy Daily opted to use the first take of the song, even though Jones flubbed the word "slug" (Jones would intentionally mimic this mistake in live performances and subsequent re-recordings of the song). Former Starday president Don Pierce later explained to Jones' biographer Bob Allen, "We tried doing the song again, but it never was as good as it was that first time. So we just released it that way."

Besides Buddy Killen, Hargus “Pig” Robbins was also a notable session participant, playing piano on the record. 

"White Lightning" became Jones' first number-one country hit - with a more convincing rock and roll sound, than the half-hearted rockabilly cuts he had previously recorded. In the liner notes to the 1994 compilation Cup of Loneliness: The Classic Mercury Years, country music historian Colin Escott writes, "Ironically, it became the pop hit Mercury had been hoping for all along...George hee-hawed it up in a giddy, bilbous frenzy."  The song gave Jones, a notorious critic of pop-country crossovers in his later years, the best showing he would ever achieve on the pop chart as well, peaking at No. 73.

Cover versions
 Waylon Jennings recorded the song for RCA.
Glen Campbell recorded the song in 1969 on his album Glen Campbell Live
 Shakin' Stevens and the Sunsets covered the song on their 1972 album Rockin' and Shakin.
 Hank Williams Jr. covered the song on his 1979 album Whiskey Bent and Hell Bound.
 Manchester post-punk band The Fall covered the song on their 1991 album Shift-Work.
 Joe Diffie recorded a cover in 1993 for the soundtrack to the film adaptation of The Beverly Hillbillies.
 The Waco Brothers covered the song on their 1997 album Cowboy in Flames.
 Frenchie Burke aka Fiddlin' Frenchie Burke did a cover of the song on his album of the same name in 2011.
 Gene Vincent and Eddie Cochran recorded a live version in 1960.

Chart performance

References

George Jones songs
Glen Campbell songs
1959 songs
1959 singles
Songs written by the Big Bopper
Songs about alcohol
Mercury Records singles
Song recordings produced by Pappy Daily